Metaweb Technologies, Inc. was a San Franciscobased company that developed Freebase, described as an "open, shared database of the world's knowledge". The company was co-founded by Danny Hillis, Veda Hlubinka-Cook and John Giannandrea in 2005.

Metaweb was acquired by Google in 2010. Google shut down Freebase in 2016, transferring some of the data that met the required notability criteria to Wikidata.

Funding
On March 14, 2006, Metaweb received $15 million in funding.  Investors included Benchmark Capital, Millennium Technology Ventures, and Omidyar Network. On January 15, 2008, Metaweb announced a $42.5 million Series B round led by Goldman Sachs and Benchmark Capital.

Kevin Harvey of Benchmark Capital was a member of Metaweb's board of directors.

Acquisition
On July 16, 2010, Google acquired Metaweb for an undisclosed sum.

References

Companies based in San Francisco
Online databases
Semantic Web companies
Companies established in 2005
Google acquisitions